Shameik Alti Moore (born May 4, 1995) is an American actor, singer, and rapper. He is best known for voicing Miles Morales / Spider-Man in the film Spider-Man: Into the Spider-Verse and its upcoming sequels.

Life and career
Moore was born in Atlanta, Georgia. He attended Druid Hills High School. His family originates from Jamaica.

Moore started off with bit roles from shows such as Tyler Perry's House of Payne, Reed Between the Lines, and Joyful Noise. In 2013, he had his first main television role on the sketch-comedy series Incredible Crew, which aired on Cartoon Network before being cancelled after one season. He then gained recognition with his portrayal of Malcolm in the 2015 film Dope, which premiered at the 2015 Sundance Film Festival. Indiewire included Moore on its list of "The 12 Major Breakouts of the 2015 Sundance Film Festival" for his performance in the movie. He is also one of the five male leads in the Netflix series The Get Down, which premiered in 2016 and was cancelled in 2017 after one half-season. Moore voiced Miles Morales in the animated film Spider-Man: Into the Spider-Verse from Sony Pictures Animation, which was released in December 2018 and will reprise the role for the sequel, Spider-Man: Across the Spider-Verse, in 2023. Since 2019, he has played Raekwon of the Wu-Tang Clan in Hulu's Wu-Tang: An American Saga.

Discography

Studio albums

Singles

Filmography

Film

Television

References

External links

1995 births
African-American male actors
African-American male rappers
21st-century American male actors
American male film actors
American male television actors
American male video game actors
American male voice actors
Living people
American rappers of Jamaican descent
21st-century American rappers
21st-century American male musicians
21st-century African-American musicians